Phineas Makhurane (13 January 1939 – 1 December 2018) was an academic and chairman of the Zimbabwe National Council for Higher Education. He was the first Vice-Chancellor of the National University of Science and Technology and a previous Pro-Vice-Chancellor of the University of Zimbabwe.

Biography 
Makhurane was one of the first Africans to study physics and mathematics at the University of Rhodesia and Nyasaland, now the University of Zimbabwe.
Among his academic achievements, he was the first to introduce industrial attachment to universities in southern Africa to replace vacation training. He retired in 2004 and died 14 years later, on 1 December 2018 at Mater Dei hospital after a long battle with diabetes.

References

2018 deaths
Academic staff of the University of Zimbabwe
Academic staff of the National University of Science and Technology, Zimbabwe
1939 births